Marcelcave is a commune in the Somme department in Hauts-de-France in northern France.

Geography
Marcelcave station has rail connections to Amiens and Laon.

Population

See also
Communes of the Somme department

References

Communes of Somme (department)